Saleh Ahmed may refer to:
 Saleh Ahmed (actor) (1930s–2019), Bangladeshi actor
 Saleh Ahmed Pamba (born 1950), Tanzanian politician
 Saleh Ahmed (cricketer, born 1969), Bangladeshi cricketer
 Saleh Ahmed Farhan (born 1981), Bahraini footballer
 Saleh Ahmed (cricketer, born 1997), Bangladeshi cricketer
 Awad Saleh Ahmed, Yemeni athlete
 Mohammed Saleh Ahmed Al-Helali, Yemeni bureaucrat